California's 25th congressional district is a congressional district in the U.S. state of California.

The district includes all of Imperial County and parts of Riverside County and San Bernardino County. Cities in the new 25th district include Cathedral City, Indio, Coachella, El Centro, Calexico, San Jacinto, Hemet, and Needles. Most of the majority-Latino parts of the Coachella Valley are in the 25th, while the rest of the valley is in the 41st district.

Demographics 
According to the APM Research Lab's Voter Profile Tools (featuring the U.S. Census Bureau's 2019 American Community Survey), the district contained about 491,000 potential voters (citizens, age 18+). Of these, 44% are White, 34% Latino, 10% Black, and 9% Asian. Immigrants make up 17% of the district's potential voters. Median income among households (with one or more potential voter) in the district is about $86,600, while 9% of households live below the poverty line. 12% of residents 25 years and older have not graduated high school, while 26% hold a bachelor's degree or higher.

Recent results in statewide elections

Composition

As of the 2020 redistricting, California's 25th congressional district is located in the Mojave Desert. It encompasses Imperial County, most of Riverside County, and the eastern edge of San Bernardino. The district covers the entirety of the Arizona-California border.

Riverside County is split between this district and the 41st district. They are partitioned by Terwillinger Rd, Bailey Rd, Candelaria, Elder Creek Rd, Bonny Ln, Tule Peak Rd, Eastgate Trail, Goldrush Rd, Rule Valley Rd, Laura Ln, Dove Dr, Lago Grande, Barbara Trail, Valley Dr, Foolish Pleasure Rd, Highway 371, Gelding Way, Puckit Dr, Indian Rd, Wellman Rd, El Toro Rd, Burnt Valley Rd, Cahuilla Rd, Highway 74, Bull Canyon Rd, Santa Rosa-San Jacinto Mountains National Monument, Fred Waring Dr, Washington St, Highway 10, Davall Dr, Dinah Shore Dr, Plumley Rd, Gerald Ford Dr, E Ramon Rd, San Luis Rey Dr, San Joaquin Dr, Clubhouse View Dr, Mount San Jacinto State Park, Azalea Creek, Black Mountain Trail, Highway 243, North Fork San Jacinto River, Stetson Ave, Hemet St, Cornell St, Girard St, E Newport Rd, Domenigoni Parkway, Leon Rd, Grand Ave, State Highway 74, California Ave, W Devonshire Ave, Warren Rd, Ramona Expressway, San Jacinto River, Highway 79, Oak Valley Parkway, Champions Dr, Union St, Brookside Ave. The 25th district takes in the cities of Coachella, Banning, Desert Hot Springs, Indio, San Jacinto, Hemet, Beaumont, and Blythe, as well as the census-designated places Valle Vista and East Hemet.

Cities & CDP with 10,000 or more people
 Hemet - 89,833
 Indio - 89,137
 Beaumont - 53,036
 San Jacinto - 49,215
 El Centro - 44,322
 Coachella - 41,941
 Calexico - 38,633
 Desert Hot Springs - 32,512
 Banning - 29,505
 Brawley - 26,416
 East Hemet - 19,432
 Valle Vista - 19,072
 Imperial - 18,631
 Blythe - 18,317

List of members representing the district

Election results

Original district: 1953–1967

First redistricting: 1967–1973

Second redistricting: 1973–1983

Third redistricting: 1983–1993

Fourth redistricting: 1993–2003

Fifth redistricting: 2003–2013

Sixth redistricting: 2013–present

See also

 List of United States congressional districts
 California's congressional districts

References

External links
 
 
 

25
Government of Los Angeles County, California
Government of Ventura County, California
Angeles National Forest
Antelope Valley
San Fernando Valley
Santa Susana Mountains
Sierra Pelona Ridge
Simi Hills
Lancaster, California
Palmdale, California
Porter Ranch, Los Angeles
Santa Clara River (California)
Santa Clarita, California
Simi Valley, California
Constituencies established in 1953
1953 establishments in California